Dyke Hard is a 2014 Swedish comedy film directed by Bitte Andersson. It was screened at the 2014 Stockholm International Film Festival and was shown in the Panorama section of the 65th Berlin International Film Festival. The film was funded by Kickstarter.

Cast
 Lina Kurttila as Riff
 Peggy Sands as Peggy
 Maria Wågensjö as Scotty
 Alle Eriksson as Bandito
 Iki Gonzalez as Dawn
 Josephine Krieg as Moira
 Anitha Nygårds as Warden Henderson
 Ylva Maria Thompson as Morgana the Ghost
 Ann-Charlotte Andersson as Lola
 Jackson Bell as King Explosion Murder
 Joseph Huncovsky as Ninja Toilet
 Henry Miazga as Henry's World Ruler

Awards
 Winner of MIX Copenhagen Audience Award 2015.

References

External links
 
 Film Website
 Kickstarter Page

2014 films
2014 comedy films
2014 LGBT-related films
2010s English-language films
Swedish comedy films
Swedish LGBT-related films
2010s Swedish-language films
LGBT-related comedy films
2014 multilingual films
Swedish multilingual films
2010s Swedish films